Lasiopetalum joyceae is a species of flowering plant in the family Malvaceae and is endemic to New South Wales. It is an erect shrub with linear leaves and small groups of pinkish to reddish-brown flowers.

Description
The sepals are pinkish to reddish-brown with woolly hairs on the back, and there are no petals. Flowering occurs in spring.

Taxonomy
Lasiopetalum joyceae was first formally described in 1929 by William Blakely in the Proceedings of the Linnean Society of New South Wales. The specific epithet (joyceae) honours "my late adopted daughter, Joyce, who was the first to bring this beautiful species under my notice".

Distribution and habitat
This lasiopetalum grows in heath on ridgetops on the Hornsby Plateau south of the Hawkesbury River, in the Sydney region of New South Wales.

Conservation status
Lasiopetalum joyceae is listed as "vulnerable" under the Australian Government Environment Protection and Biodiversity Conservation Act 1999 and the New South Wales Government Biodiversity Conservation Act 2016.

References

joyceae
Malvales of Australia
Flora of New South Wales
Plants described in 1929
Taxa named by William Blakely